NCAA Season 90 is the 2014–15 collegiate athletic year of the National Collegiate Athletic Association in the Philippines. It is hosted by the Jose Rizal University and was opened on June 28, 2014, at the Mall of Asia Arena in Pasay.

It is the last season for the Lyceum of the Philippines University Pirates, who play their second year as probationary and the Emilio Aguinaldo College Generals, who play their fifth year as probationary, as probationary members; their performance in the Season 90 would be the basis for the decision if they will be admitted as regular members of the league.

This is the last season that Sports5 will be covering the NCAA Season; starting Season 91 (2015-16 Athletic Year), the Collegiate league will return to ABS-CBN Sports, its former broadcaster from 2002 to 2011.

Basketball

Basketball tournaments were officially opened on June 28, 2014 at the Mall of Asia Arena. Proceeding games are expected to be held at the San Juan Arena.

Seniors' tournament

Elimination round

Playoffs
During this, this finals was the first time Arellano made it to the finals and San Beda's ninth straight finals appearance and won their fifth straight championship

Juniors' tournament

Elimination round

Playoffs

Volleyball
The volleyball events of the NCAA Season 90 was open at the Mall of Asia Arena with the first five games. The games are all women's division.

Swimming
 The swimming events of Season 90 were held on August 20–22, 2014 at the Rizal Memorial Sports Complex.

Men's tournament
Season host is boldfaced.

Women's tournament
Season host is boldfaced.

Juniors' tournament
Season host is boldfaced.

Table Tennis
The NCAA tennis tournament opened on Sept. 15. The games were held at the Ninoy Aquino Stadium.

First round

Men's tournament
Season host is boldfaced.

Women's tournament
Season host is boldfaced.

Juniors' tournament
Season host is boldfaced.

Second round

Men's tournament

Women's tournament

Juniors' tournament

Badminton 
The NCAA badminton tournament opened on September 6, 2014 at the Powerplay Badminton Center.

Final Team Standings

Men's tournament

Women's tournament

Juniors' tournament

Chess

Men's tournament

Elimination round

Season host is boldfaced. 
Probationary teams are italicised.

Semifinals
Probationary teams are italicised.

Juniors' tournament

Elimination round

Season host is boldfaced. 
Probationary teams are italicised.

Semifinals
Probationary teams are italicised.

General Championship Summary
The current point system gives 50 points to the champion team in a certain NCAA event, 40 to the runner-up, and 35 to the third placer. The following points are given in consequent order of finish: 30, 25, 20, 15, 10, 8 and 6. For every non-participation of a member school, 5 points will be deducted to the point system.

Seniors' division championships

Medal table

Overall championship tally

Seniors' Division

References

See also 
 UAAP Season 77

2014 in multi-sport events
2015 in multi-sport events
2014 in Philippine sport
National Collegiate Athletic Association (Philippines) seasons
2015 in Philippine sport